Nostrand Avenue was a station on the demolished BMT Fulton Street Line. It was originally built on April 24, 1888 and had 2 tracks and 2 side platforms. It was served by trains of the BMT Fulton Street Line, and served as the eastern terminus of the line for a month and a week. Nostrand Avenue station had connections to at least four streetcar lines; The Nostrand Avenue Trolley, the Lorimer Street Line, the Marcy Avenue Line, and the Ocean Avenue Line trolleys. Under the Dual Contracts, the station was the west end of a project to expand the line from two to three tacks. On April 9, 1936, the Independent Subway System built the Nostrand Avenue Subway Station along the IND Fulton Street Line. The el station became obsolete, and it closed on May 31, 1940.

References

Defunct BMT Fulton Street Line stations
Railway stations in the United States opened in 1888
Railway stations closed in 1940